Licelott C. Marte de Barrios (30 April 1934 – 13 June 2019) was a Dominican lawyer, diplomat, politician, and accountant.

Biography 
Licelott Catalina Marte Hoffiz was born on 30 April 1934 in Santo Domingo to Santos Mélido Marte Pichardo—minister of Defense in 1961—and Aurora Altagracia Hoffiz Pastor.

In her youth she was elected Queen of the Carnival of San Cristóbal and Miss Santiago.

She graduated in 1958 as Juris Doctor from the University of Santo Domingo, and has post-grades from the Pontifical Catholic University Mother and Teacher and Universidad Iberoamericana (UNIBE) universities. She was Minister of Finance from 1990 to 1993, Chair-Minister of REFIDOMSA from 1993–1996, and Deputy for the National District from 2002 to 2006.

Marte de Barrios served as the Chair of the Audit Chamber of the Dominican Republic from October 2008 to February 2017.

Licelott died on 13 June 2019, after being several days at a Dominican hospital fighting cancer.

References 

1934 births
2019 deaths
People from Santo Domingo
Government accounting officials
Finance ministers of the Dominican Republic
Government ministers of the Dominican Republic
Members of the Chamber of Deputies of the Dominican Republic
Women members of the Congress of the Dominican Republic
Dominican Republic women lawyers
Pontificia Universidad Católica Madre y Maestra alumni
Universidad Autónoma de Santo Domingo alumni
Dominican Republic people of Lebanese descent
Social Christian Reformist Party politicians
Dominican Republic diplomats
Grand Cross of the Order of Civil Merit
Commanders of the Ordre national du Mérite
Grand Crosses with Silver Breast Star of the Order of Merit of Duarte, Sánchez and Mella
Women government ministers of the Dominican Republic
Female finance ministers
20th-century Dominican Republic women politicians
20th-century Dominican Republic politicians
21st-century Dominican Republic women politicians
21st-century Dominican Republic politicians
20th-century Dominican Republic lawyers